John Gloag (10 August 1896 - 17 July 1981)  was an English writer in the fields of furniture design and architecture, and science and speculative fiction. Gloag served with the Welsh Guards during the First World War, and was invalided home after suffering gas poisoning.

Writings on design 
Artifex, or the Future of Craftsmanship (1926), part of the To-day and To-morrow series, was a pamphlet by Gloag that discussed the relationship between artistic craftmanship and mass production.

Gloag's A Short Dictionary of Furniture (1969) was a reference book covering the history and types of furniture from the tenth century to the 1960s.

Novels 
Gloag's first science fiction novel, Tomorrow's Yesterday, (1932) was inspired by the work of H.G. Wells
and Gloag's friend Olaf Stapledon. 
  Tomorrow's Yesterday
is a satire that depicts a race of cat people from the distant future observing human society. 
 In The New Pleasure (1933) a powder that greatly
increases the sense of smell causes a social upheaval.  Winter's Youth (1934) revolves around a
longevity technology, which falls into the hands of a corrupt politician, 
with disastrous social consequences. In Manna (1940) 
a journalist discovers a plan to develop a fungus that could end world hunger. 
99% (1944) is about an experiment to give humans access to their race memory.

Later in his career Gloag wrote historical fantasy novels; Caesar of the Narrow Seas (1969), 
The Eagles Depart (1973) and Artorius Rex (1977).Artorius Rex
focuses on King Arthur and Sir Kay.

Fiction publications

Novels
 Tomorrow's Yesterday (1932)
 The New Pleasure (1933)
 Winter's Youth (1934)
 Sweet Racket (1936)
 Ripe for Development (1936)
 Sacred Edifice (1937, revised 1954)
 Documents Marked Secret (1938)
 Unwilling Adventurer (1940)
 Manna (1940)
 I Want An Audience (1941)
 Mr. Buckby is Not at Home (1942)
 99% (1944)
 In Camera (1945)
 Kind Uncle Buckby (1946)
 All England At Home (1949)
 Not in the Newspapers (1953)
 Slow (1954)
 Unlawful Justice (1962)
 Rising Suns (1964)
 Caesar of the Narrow Seas (1969)
 The Eagles Depart (1973)
 Artorius Rex (1977)

Short Stories
 It Makes a Nice Change (1938)
 First One and Twenty (1946)
 Take One a Week: An Omnibus of Volume of 52 Short Stories (1950)

Selected non-fiction publications
The architectural interpretation of history 
Artifex, or the Future of Craftsmanship 1926 
A Short Dictionary of Furniture (first edition 1952) 1969. 
revised and expanded as John Gloag's Dictionary of Furniture 1990. London, Unwin Hyman 
Colour & comfort in decoration 
The Englishman's castle 
Georgian grace 
Guide to Furniture Styles English and French 1450 to 1850 London: A & C Black. 
Guide to Western architecture 
Industrial art explained 
Victorian Comfort: A Social History of Design from 1830-1900 1961. London: A & C Black.

References 

1896 births
1981 deaths
English science fiction writers
English fantasy writers
English male short story writers
English short story writers
English male novelists
20th-century English novelists
20th-century British short story writers
Welsh Guards soldiers
20th-century English male writers
English male non-fiction writers